Tarbes station (French: Gare de Tarbes) is a railway station in Tarbes, Occitanie, France. The station is on the Toulouse–Bayonne railway line. The station is served by TGV (high speed trains), Intercités de Nuit (night trains), Intercités (long distance) and TER (local) services operated by the SNCF.

Train services
The following services currently call at Tarbes:
TGV services Paris - Saint-Pierre-des-Corps - Bordeaux - Dax - Pau - Tarbes
intercity services (Intercités) Hendaye–Bayonne–Pau–Tarbes–Toulouse
local service (TER Nouvelle-Aquitaine) Bordeaux-Dax–Pau–Tarbes
local service (TER Nouvelle-Aquitaine) Bayonne–Pau–Tarbes
local service (TER Occitanie) Toulouse–Saint-Gaudens–Tarbes–Pau

See also 

 List of SNCF stations in Occitanie

References

Railway stations in Hautes-Pyrénées
Railway stations in France opened in 1859